...And Then Tomorrow Came is the third album from Muph & Plutonic and was released in July 2008.

It was listed as Triple J's feature album for the week of its release.

The album was also nominated for 'Best Urban Release' at the 2008 ARIA awards.

Track listing
 "The Damn Truth" - 2:54
 "Balloon Heads" (feat Kye) - 3:39
 "Number 45" - 3:39
 "Yesterday's Basement" - 4:14
 "Beautiful Ugly" (feat Jess Harlen) - 4:14
 "Sleep" - 3:34
 "Show Me Your Face" - 3:08
 "Filthy Rich" (feat Paul Williamson) - 3:27
 "And Then Tomorrow Came" (feat Pete Lawler) - 3:59
 "Today" (feat Raph Boogie, Eligh, The Grouch and The Tongue) - 5:24
 "Size of the Soul" - 3:42
 "Wrong" - 3:32
 "Don't Worry About Nothin'" (feat Jess Harlen) - 4:00

Charts

References

2006 albums
Muph & Plutonic albums
Obese Records albums